The 2013 Kumho Tyres V8 Touring Car Series was an Australian motor racing series for V8 Touring Cars, which are de-registered and superseded former V8 Supercars. Although the series utilised cars built for V8 Supercar racing, it was not an official V8 Supercar series.

It was the sixth running of the V8 Touring Car National Series. The series took place on the program of Shannons Nationals Motor Racing Championships events. It began at Sydney Motorsport Park on 22 March and finished at Sandown Raceway on 17 November after six meetings held in New South Wales, Victoria, Queensland and South Australia.

Shae Davies was the eventual series winner, holding off at late charge from Ryan Simpson. Simpson now holds the record for the most race wins in one V8 Touring Car Season, as well as the most round wins in a row.

Teams and drivers

The following teams and drivers competed in the 2013 Kumho Tyres V8 Touring Car Series

Calendar
The series was contested over six rounds.

Points system

Series results

References

Kumho
V8 Touring Car Series